C89 may refer to:

Science and technology
 C89 (C version) or ANSI C, a C programming-language revision
 NGC 6087 (Caldwell catalogue: C89), an open cluster in the constellation Norma

Other uses
 Ruy Lopez (ECO code: C60–C99), a chess opening
 Night Work (Women) Convention (Revised), 1948, an ILO convention
 Sylvania Airport (FAA LID), Wisconsin, US

See also
 HMNZS Royalist (C89), a 1942 New Zealand Royal navy cruiser
 KNHC, a radio station in Seattle, Washington known as C89.5